Radha Krishna Kishore is an Indian politician. He was a Member of the Jharkhand Legislative Assembly from the Chhatarpur Assembly constituency from 2005 to 2009 and 2014 to 2014. He was associated with the Janata Dal (United) and All Jharkhand Students Union and joined Bharatiya Janata Party in 2019.

References

Living people
21st-century Indian politicians
Lok Sabha members from Jharkhand
People from Palamu district
1959 births
Date of birth missing (living people)
Place of birth missing (living people)
Bharatiya Janata Party politicians from Jharkhand
Janata Dal (United) politicians from Jharkhand
All Jharkhand Students Union politicians
Rashtriya Janata Dal politicians